Dakhal is a 1981 Indian Bengali film directed by Gautam Ghose, with Mamata Shankar, Robin Sen Gupta, Sunil Mukherjee and Sujal Roy Chowdhury in lead roles. The film is about a woman belonging to nomadic tribe from Andhra Pradesh, known as crow hunters, who elopes and moves to south Bengal and makes a living by occult practices. It deals with the issue of exploitation of tribal people by the deceitful landlord. The film was based on Amma, a short story of Sushil Jana.

This the first Bengali-language feature film by Ghosh, who had previously made documentaries and Maa Bhoomi in Telugu. At the 29th National Film Awards it won the awards for Best Feature Film. At the 11th International Human Rights Film Festival in Paris it won the Grand Jury Prize.

Cast
 Mamata Shankar as  Andi
 Robin Sen Gupta
 Sunil Mukherjee
 Sujal Roy Chowdhury
 Bimal Deb

References

External links
 

1981 films
Bengali-language Indian films
Best Feature Film National Film Award winners
Social realism in film
Films directed by Goutam Ghose
Films set in West Bengal
1980s Bengali-language films
Films based on Indian novels